Qiu County or Qiuxian is a county in the south of Hebei province, China. It is under the administration of Handan City.

Administrative divisions

Towns:
Xinmatou, Qiucheng, Xiangchenggu, Liang'erzhuang

Townships:
Guchengying Township, Nanxindian Township, Chencun Hui Ethnic Township

Climate

References

External links

County-level divisions of Hebei
Handan